Stephen Brown is an American producer, media executive and entrepreneur.

He has spent the majority of his career in the media industry as a senior executive and board member. 

Productions on which he is credited include Seven, The Fugitive, The Devil's Advocate and A Perfect Murder.

Career 
Brown produced "The Ottoman Lieutenant". Brown is a co-founder and partner in Ambitious Productions, an integrated digital and traditional media production company. 
Previously, Brown served as president and CEO of USA-Intertainment Inc., a subsidiary of Intertainment AG.
Prior to joining Intertainment, Brown was president of Kopelson Entertainment.
Since 2008 he has served as a consultant to Vahid & Associates Brand Futurists in Bahrain.

References

1961 births
Living people
American film producers